Zababa-šuma-iddina was the 35th and next to last king of the Kassite  or 3rd dynasty of Babylon, who reigned for just one year, ca. 1158 BC (short chronology). He was without apparent ties to the royal family and there is uncertainty concerning the circumstances of his coming to power.

Biography

Ascendancy

A late Assyrian tablet provides a prophetic narrative and suggests it was his predecessor Marduk-apla-iddina I, who did indeed reign for 13 years, and who was overthrown by the Elamites, perhaps combining the two sequential reigns into a single individual:

Invasions by Assyria and Elam

His short unhappy reign was subjected to invasions on two different fronts. One of these was where Assyrian forces under the leadership of Aššur-dan I annexed the region lying between the Lower Zab and the Adhaim, or Al Uzaym River, seizing control of Zaban, Irriya and Urgarsallu, and carrying off much plunder.

His lack of connection to the previous royal family into which the Elamite rulers had intermarried for several generations led Kudur-Nahhunte, king of Elam, and whose father, Shutruk-Nahhunte, was married to the thirty-third Babylonian king Meli-Šipak’s eldest daughter, to believe his claim to the throne of Babylon was more legitimate. A Neo-Babylonian copy of a literary text which takes the form of a letter, now located in the Vorderasiatisches Museum in Berlin, is addressed to the Kassite court by an Elamite King, thought to be Kudur-Nahhunte, and details the genealogy of the Elamite royalty of this period. He casts aspersions on their choice of king and then declares:

 
There are some concerns over the authenticity of this “letter” as it makes a derogatory reference to a later king, Nabu-apla-iddina, ca. 888 – 855 BC. It may, however, preserve some traditions of the period.

Kudur-Nahhunte led an assault on northern Babylonia which resulted in the end of Zababa-šuma-iddina’s reign. The event is described in a late Babylonian poetic text purporting to be narrated by a later king, possibly Nabû-kudurrī-uṣur I. He left his inscriptions on many of the trophies he collected for display in the temples of Susa, each with its boastful addendum, to confirm it was he who had conquered Babylonia. A fragment of an Elemite stele describes crossing the river Ulai and seizing seven hundred towns. Another fragment lists the northern cities that had been overthrown including Dur-Kurigalzu, Sippar, Opis, perhaps Akkad and Eshnunna.

A single economic text, a contract mentioning Itti-ezida-lummir, is extant dated to his accession year and was recovered in the Merkes area of Babylon.

Inscriptions

Notes

References

12th-century BC Babylonian kings
Kassite kings
12th-century BC rulers
Late Bronze Age collapse